Oluwatimilehin Sobowale (born 22 January 2002) is an Irish professional footballer who plays as a defender, for Norwegian Third Division club Florø SK.

Early life
Sobowale was born in Dundalk to Nigerian parents.

Club career

Manchester City
In August 2018, Sobowale joined Manchester City from Waterford based side Villa FC.

Real Monarchs
On 10 May 2021, Sobowale signed with USL Championship side Real Monarchs. He made his professional debut on 9 June 2021, starting in a 2–0 win over Sacramento Republic.

Wigan Athletic
On 2 February 2022 Sobowale signed a short term contract with Wigan Athletic, joining the under-23 side until the end of the 2021-22 season following a successful trial. He was released at the end of the season.

Waterford
On 1 September 2022, it was announced that Sobowale had signed for League of Ireland First Division side Waterford until the end of the season in November, where he would play alongside his brother Tunmise Sobowale for the first time.

Florø SK
In January 2023, Sobowale signed for Norwegian Third Division club Florø SK.

International career
Sobowale made seven starts in nine matches for Ireland U-17s, along with two appearances each for the U-18s and U-19s in 2019.

Personal life
Timi's brother Tunmise Sobowale is also a professional footballer. The pair played on the same team together for the first time, when Timi signed for Waterford in 2022.

References

2002 births
Living people
People from Dundalk
Association football defenders
Republic of Ireland association footballers
Republic of Ireland youth international footballers
Irish people of Nigerian descent
Expatriate footballers in England
Expatriate soccer players in the United States
Irish expatriate sportspeople in the United States
Real Monarchs players
Waterford F.C. players
USL Championship players
League of Ireland players
Florø SK players